Group Captain (retired) John Ibiwari Ben Kalio was Administrator of Yobe State from August 1996 to August 1998 during the military regime of General Sani Abacha.
In October 1997, Yobe State Television aired a 45-minute documentary on the achievements of his predecessor, Police Commander Dabo Aliyu. According to Media Rights Agenda, Kalio ordered the arrest of the eight workers on duty at the station, which was shut down, and had them taken to his office where they were beaten.
Also as a military Governor, he invested in mechanized agriculture, he increased access to education and healthcare at the rural level and pursued numerous social programs for the poor.

References

Governors of Yobe State
Living people
Year of birth missing (living people)